San Mauro may refer to:

People
Saint Maurus (it. : San Mauro), an Italian Christian saint
Rabanus Maurus (780–856), German Christian saint

Places in Italy
San Mauro Castelverde, a municipality in the Province of Palermo
San Mauro Cilento, a municipality in the Province of Salerno
San Mauro di Saline, a municipality in the Province of Verona
San Mauro Forte, a municipality in the Province of Matera
San Mauro la Bruca, a municipality in the Province of Salerno
San Mauro Marchesato, a municipality in the Province of Crotone
San Mauro Pascoli, a municipality in the Province of Forlì-Cesena
San Mauro Torinese, a municipality in the Province of Turin

See also
Mauro (disambiguation)
Maura (disambiguation)
Maurus (disambiguation)